The Batajnica Air Show or the Serbian Air Show is an annual international airshow hosted at the Batajnica Air Base, Serbia, conducted and exhibitioned by the Serbian Air Force and international participants.

2009 Air Show
200 participants from 15 countries took part including:

 Austria
 Czech Republic
 Denmark
 France
 Greece
 Hungary
 Italy
 Romania
 Serbia (host)
 Slovenia
 Spain
 Turkey
 United Kingdom
 United States

Over 100,000 spectators attended the 2009 show.

Aircraft
Over 40 aircraft, and 16 different types participated in the air show:

Aérospatiale Alouette III
Aérospatiale Gazelle
Alpha Jet
Antonov An-2
Antonov An-26
Eurofighter Typhoon
General Dynamics F-16 Fighting Falcon
Lasta 95
Pilatus PC9
Saab JAS 39 Gripen
Soko J-22 Orao
Soko G-4 Super Galeb
MiG-21
MiG-29
Mil Mi-17
Mil Mi-24
Utva 75

References

External links

Official website

Air shows
Tourist attractions in Serbia
Tourist attractions in Belgrade
Serbian Air Force and Air Defence
Aviation in Serbia
Annual events in Serbia
Zemun